Grevillea cyranostigma, commonly known as Carnarvon grevillea or green grevillea, is a species of flowering plant in the family Proteaceae and is endemic to the Carnarvon Range and adjacent areas of central Queensland. It is a spreading shrub with woolly-hairy to silky-hairy branchlets, narrowly oblong leaves, and pale green flowers.

Description

Taxonomy
Grevillea cyranostigma was first formally described in 1975 by Don McGillivray in the journal Telopea from specimens collected between 1890 and 1895 by Harriette Biddulph of Mount Playfair Station, who was known for her collection of plants from the Carnarvon Range. The specific epithet (cyranostigma) is a reference to Edmond Rostand's play, Cyrano de Bergerac, as the long stigma is reminiscent of the character's protruding nose. 

The species appears to be related to Grevillea sericea and G. victoriae, and is distinguished by glossier leaves than the former and a less hairy perianth than both.

Distribution and habitat
Carnarvon grevillea is restricted to the Carnarvon Range in Central Queensland, where it is found on rocky slopes on sandstone soils in dry sclerophyll forest.

Conservation status
This grevillea is listed as of "least concern" under the Queensland Government Nature Conservation Act 1992.

Use in horticulture
Grevillea cyranostigma has been grown in gardens in Brisbane and Melbourne and appears to adapt readily to cultivation, although does not tolerate extended dry periods. It has been mainly cultivated by collectors and enthusiasts of grevilleas.

References

cyranostigma
Flora of Queensland
Proteales of Australia
Plants described in 1975
Taxa named by Donald McGillivray